George Rolph (April 7, 1794 – July 25, 1875) was a lawyer and political figure in Upper Canada. He worked in the Hamilton and Ancaster area as a Clerk of the Peace and clerk of the district court. He represented Halton County in the Parliament of Upper Canada.

Early life

Rolph was born in Thornbury, South Gloucestershire, England on April 7, 1794. His father was Thomas Rolph and his mother was Frances Petty. He moved to Upper Canada in 1808 and settled in Vittoria, Upper Canada.

He served as a lieutenant in the Norfolk militia during the War of 1812. He participated in the Siege of Detroit and was awarded a gold medal for outstanding service. He studied law at Osgoode Hall Law School in York, Upper Canada. He was a lawyer in Hamilton and Ancaster. He was appointed as a Clerk of the Peace, clerk of the district court and registrar of the Surrogate Court in April 1816, all with the Gore District.

Career

In June 1826, Mrs. Evans stayed with Rolph to be away from her abusive husband. A group of men thought Rolph was having a sexual relationship with Evans and dragged him from his home to tar and feather him. Rolph sued Titus Simons, James Hamilton and Alexander Robertson in a civil lawsuit and hired his brother, John Rolph, to be his lawyer. The trial commenced in August 1827, and the jury awarded £40 to Rolph to be paid by Simons and Hamilton.

In 1828, Rolph was reelected to the Parliament of Upper Canada to represent Halton County. The county magistrates fired Rolph as a Clerk of the Peace, but a committee of the Parliament ruled that the dismissal was improper and recommended Rolph's reappointment. At this time John was focusing on his medical career and slowly transferred his cases to George. George Rolph's term in the Upper Canada Parliament ended in 1830.

Personal life and death

Rolph's wife was Georgianna Clement. He died on July 25, 1875, in Dundas, Ontario.

Citations

Works cited

External links 
The history of the town of Dundas. Part 1 of a series, TR Woodhouse (1965)
The Medical profession in Upper Canada, 1783-1850 ..., W Canniff (1894)

1794 births
1875 deaths
Members of the Legislative Assembly of Upper Canada
People from Thornbury, Gloucestershire